In astronomy, a disrupted planet is a planet or exoplanet or, perhaps on a somewhat smaller scale, a planetary-mass object, planetesimal, moon, exomoon or asteroid that has been disrupted or destroyed by a nearby or passing astronomical body or object such as a star. Necroplanetology is the related study of such a process. Nonetheless, the result of such a disruption may be the production of excessive amounts of related gas, dust and debris, which may eventually surround the parent star in the form of a circumstellar disk or debris disk. As a consequence, the orbiting debris field may be an "uneven ring of dust", causing erratic light fluctuations in the apparent luminosity of the parent star, as may have been responsible for the oddly flickering light curves associated with the starlight observed from certain variable stars, such as that from  Tabby's Star (KIC 8462852), RZ Piscium and WD 1145+017. Excessive amounts of infrared radiation may be detected from such stars, suggestive evidence in itself that dust and debris may be orbiting the stars.

Examples

Planets
Examples of planets, or their related remnants, considered to have been a disrupted planet, or part of such a planet, include:  'Oumuamua and WD 1145+017 b, as well as asteroids, hot Jupiters and those that are hypothetical planets, like Fifth planet, Phaeton, Planet V and Theia.

Stars
Examples of parent stars considered to have disrupted a planet include: EPIC 204278916, Tabby's Star (KIC 8462852), PDS 110, RZ Piscium, WD 1145+017 and 47 Ursae Majoris.

Tabby's Star light curve
Tabby's Star (KIC 8462852) is an F-type main-sequence star exhibiting unusual light fluctuations, including up to a 22% dimming in brightness. Several hypotheses have been proposed to explain these irregular changes, but none to date fully explain all aspects of the curve. One explanation is that an "uneven ring of dust" orbits Tabby's Star. However, in September 2019, astronomers reported that the observed dimmings of Tabby's Star may have been produced by fragments resulting from the disruption of an orphaned exomoon.

See also 

 Former dwarf planets
 Asteroid belt
 BD+20°307
 Formation and evolution of the Solar System
 Giant-impact hypothesis
 Interstellar medium
 List of stars that dim oddly
 Nebular hypothesis
 Planetesimal
 Protoplanetary disk
 Tidal force
 WD 0145+234 (star disrupting an exoasteroid)

References

Further reading

External links 
 NASA – WD 1145+017 b at The Extrasolar Planets Encyclopaedia.
 , a presentation by Tabetha S. Boyajian.
 , a presentation by Issac Arthur.
 , star with unusual light fluctuations (21 December 2017).

Circumstellar disks
Hypothetical astronomical objects
Planetary rings
Unsolved problems in astronomy